Westminster College is a private college in Salt Lake City, Utah. The college was founded in 1875 and comprises four schools.

History
Westminster College was founded in 1875 as the Salt Lake Collegiate Institute, a preparatory school. Westminster first offered college classes in 1897 as Sheldon Jackson College. Named in honor of its primary benefactor and a Presbyterian minister, Sheldon Jackson, the college operated for many years on the Collegiate Institute campus in downtown Salt Lake City under the supervision of the First Presbyterian Church of Salt Lake City.

The college changed its name to Westminster College in 1902 to better reflect a more general Protestant education.  The name is derived from the Westminster Confession of Faith, a Presbyterian confession of faith, which was named for the district of London where it was devised. The University of Westminster, London is a separate higher education institution in the United Kingdom and is not affiliated with Westminster College.

High school level classes ceased to be offered in 1945, and Westminster became the first accredited two-year junior college in the intermountain area. In 1935, Westminster modified its curriculum to qualify as a four-year junior college and in 1949 became a four-year liberal arts university offering baccalaureate degrees in the arts and sciences. 

On September 19, 2022, President Bethami Dobkin announced that starting Fall semester 2023, Westminster College would be known as Westminster University to reflect the comprehensive institutional offerings of the school. 

Students from all religions are welcome, as Westminster severed its official ties to the Presbyterian church in 1974. In 2019 the college replaced its traditional crest emblem, a shield emblazoned with the term Pro Christo et Libertate ("For Christ and Liberty"), for a new seal bearing the motto Discendo Vita Abundantior ("Life Made More Abundant by Learning").

Campus
Emigration Creek runs through the campus. This land was donated by Civil War Veteran Colonel William M. Ferry Jr.

On campus are two gyms each equipped with a basketball court, weight room, and studio.

The larger of the buildings, the Eccles Health Wellness and Athletics Center (HWAC), also has an indoor pool, three story rock climbing wall, and racket ball court.

As Westminster College is located on 27 acres in the heart of Salt Lake City, administration has had to be careful and smart about the growing student population. The sixteenth president of Westminster College, Dr. Michael S. Bassis, saw a need for growing into and connecting with the Sugar House community. During his presidency he acquired Garfield School to the east, with plans on converting it into a center for the arts. However, it was sold to the Elizabeth Academy, a private Montessori school in February 2017.

Dr. Bassis also struck a deal to have Westminster on the Draw built on 1300 East, directly across the street from Sugar House Park. This seven-floor space has many uses. The bottom level is used as academic and event space, the second floor (street level) is used as business space, and the remaining floors are used as housing for upper-classmen and graduate students.

Administration
Westminster College has had nineteen presidents since its founding; the current president, Bethami Dobkin, was appointed in July 2018.
It has an endowment of $79 million as of June 30th, 2020.

Academics
Westminster College comprises four schools: the School of Arts and Sciences, the Bill and Vieve Gore School of Business, the School of Education, and the School of Nursing and Health Sciences. The college operates on a fall and spring semester system with a mini term in May and eight- and twelve-week summer terms.

Westminster offers 38 undergraduate majors conferring BS, BBA, BA, and BFA degrees, which do not include its customized majors and pre-med, pre-law, and pre-dental programs. In addition to a number of post-baccalaureate certificate programs in various fields, Westminster also offers 13 graduate degrees: Master of Business Administration (MBA), Project-Based Master of Business Administration (MBA), Master of Business Administration in Technology Commercialization (MBATC), Master of Accountancy (MAcc), Master of Arts in Community Leadership (MACL), Master of Arts in Teaching (MAT), Master of Education (MEd), Doctor of Nursing Practice (DNP), Doctor of Nursing Practice - Nurse Anesthesia (DNAP), Master of Public Health (MPH), Master of Science in Mental Health Counseling (MSMHC), Master of Science in Nursing: Family Nurse Practitioner (MSN), and Master of Strategic Communication (MSC).

Westminster College recently launched a new program within the Gore School of Business focusing on training students to be entrepreneurs. The Center for New Enterprise will offer graduate and undergraduate degrees as well as community education programs in entrepreneurship.

Westminster College is accredited by the Northwest Commission on Colleges and Universities. Programs throughout the college are accredited as well.

Recognition
U.S. News & World Report ranked Westminster in its 2022 “Best College” guide in the following lists: “Best Regional Universities” (No. 18); “Best Value Schools” (No. 19); "Best College for Veterans" (No. 9); "Best Undergraduate Teaching (No. 15).

Student life
The college has over 70 campus clubs and organizations. The Associated Students of Westminster is the student association on campus. The school newspaper is a bi-weekly called "The Forum". There is also a nationally recognized literary journal known as Ellipsis.  The Estonian, Westminster's student yearbook, was last published in 1987. The college publishes an alumni magazine, The Westminster Review, on a bi-annual schedule.

Athletics

The Westminster athletic teams are called the Griffins. The college is a member of the NCAA Division II ranks, primarily competing in the Rocky Mountain Athletic Conference (RMAC) for most of its sports since the 2015–16 academic year (which they were a member on a previous stint from 1967–68 to 1978–79 before suspending its athletics program); while its men's and women's alpine skiing teams compete in the Rocky Mountain Intercollegiate Ski Association (RMISA) affiliated with the NCAA. The Griffins previously competed in the Frontier Conference of the National Association of Intercollegiate Athletics (NAIA) from 1998–99 to 2014–15.

Westminster competes in 15 intercollegiate varsity sports: Men's sports include alpine ski, basketball, cross country, golf, lacrosse, soccer and track & field; while women's sports include alpine ski, basketball, cross country, golf, lacrosse, soccer, track & field and volleyball. Current non-NCAA sports include cheerleading, cycling, dance, men's soccer (club) and snowboard.

Olympians
More than 50 Olympians have pursued their educational aspirations at Westminster, earning degrees along with 10 medals. The Griffins have competed in at least four Winter Olympic Games. Most of them as part of a 2005–2018 partnership between the college and U.S. Ski and Snowboard. Twenty-three Westminster students made up 10% of Team USA in Sochi and 18 students competed in the 2018 Pyeongchang games. In the 2022 Winter Olympics, 8 Olympians from Westminster will represent four different countries in Beijing: the U.S., Philippines, Ireland and Slovenia. One alum will compete in qualifying races for the 2022 USA Paralympic alpine skiing team.

History
Prior to 1979, Westminster College athletic teams were called the Parsons, and the school was a member of the RMAC, which was a member of the NAIA at the time. The school joined said conference in the 1967–68 academic year. Football, basketball, and other team sports were offered at the intercollegiate level. That year, however, a financial crisis at the school caused it to discontinue its intercollegiate athletic program. Beginning in the 1990s, Westminster gradually began to restore an intercollegiate athletic program. After playing for many years in the NAIA, Westminster joined the NCAA Division II ranks and returning back to the RMAC in 2015, which later gained full member status in 2018.

Notable alumni

Maude Adams – first American actress to play Peter Pan on Broadway; theatrical lighting and color photography researcher; LGBTQ luminary
Mildred J. Berryman – pioneering researcher of the lesbian and gay community in post-WWI Utah
Maddie Bowman – 2014 Olympic gold medalist in ski halfpipe; Team USA, Freestyle Skiing; Two-time Olympian for the US (2014, 2018)
Ray Bradford (2007) – Forbes "30 Under 30" honoree, 2012
Les Brown – Tight end for the Miami Dolphins
Janet H. Clark -Minnesota state legislator
Joss Christensen – 2014 Olympic gold medalist in slopestyle; Team USA, Freestyle Skiing; One-time Olympian for the US (2014)
Alex Deibold (2019) – 2014 Olympic bronze medalist in snowboardcross; Team USA, Snowboarding; One-time Olympian for the US (2014)
Jim Eliopulos – Linebacker for the New York Jets
Kaitlyn Farrington (2012) – 2014 Olympic gold medalist in halfpipe; Team USA, Snowboarding; One-time Olympian for the US (2014)
Otto Harbach – Broadway lyricist/librettist
David Litvack (1994) – Utah State House Representative for the 26th district and Alumni Board member
Devin Logan (2023) – 2014 Olympic silver medalist in slopestyle; Team USA, Freestyle Skiing; Three-time Olympian for the US (2014, 2018, 2022)
Jonathan Midol – 2014 Olympic bronze medalist in ski-cross; Team France, Freestyle Skiing; One-time Olympian for France (2014)
Colby Stevenson – 2022 Olympic silver medalist in big air; Team USA, Freestyle Skiing; One-time Olympian for the US (2022)
Michael Stockton (2011) – Professional basketball player for Budivelnyk of the Ukrainian Basketball Super League
Geoff Stradling – Hollywood composer and orchestrator for TV series and movies. Stradling frequently works on movie scores with Ladd McIntosh, a former Westminster professor who led the Westminster Jazz Band to numerous awards in the early 1970s
Spencer West – Motivational speaker and disability advocate
Vic Wild – 2014 Olympic gold medalist in parallel giant slalom; Team Russia, Snowboarding; One-time Olympian for Russia (2014)
Richard D. Wood (1977) – Molecular biologist and winner of the 1998 Meyenburg Prize

References

External links
 Official website
 Official athletics website

 
Schools in Salt Lake City
Educational institutions established in 1875
Universities and colleges accredited by the Northwest Commission on Colleges and Universities
Universities and colleges in Salt Lake County, Utah
Tourist attractions in Salt Lake City
University and college buildings on the National Register of Historic Places in Utah
Private universities and colleges in Utah
Universities and colleges affiliated with the Presbyterian Church (USA)
1875 establishments in Utah Territory